Manvendra Singh Gohil (born 23 September 1965) is an Indian prince, being  the son and probable heir of the honorary Maharaja of Rajpipla. Many consider him to be the first openly gay prince in the world, and he is known be one of India's foremost LGBT activists. He runs a charity, the Lakshya Trust, which works with the LGBT community.

Biography 
He was born in Ajmer, the only son of Maharana Shri Raghubir Singhji Rajendrasinghji Sahib, Maharana of Rajpipla, and his wife, Maharani Rukmini Devi. He has one sister, Minaxi Kumari, who married into the princely family of Chenani in Jammu and Kashmir.

In 1971, the government of India "de-recognized" the Indian princes, and Manvendra's father lost the official title of Maharaja and the privy purse (an annual pension) that came with it. The princes adjusted to the new socialist regime; the Rajpipla royals converted their family seat, the Rajvant Palace in Rajpipla, into a tourist resort and location for film-shooting. They also set up a second residence in Mumbai. He was educated at Bombay Scottish School and at the Amrutben Jivanlal College of Commerce and Economics (one of the institutions in the Mithibai College campus in Vile Parle, Mumbai).

His parents entered him into an arranged marriage, and in January 1991, he wed Chandrika Kumari, a princess of Jhabua State in Madhya Pradesh. Manvendra says about his marriage:
"I thought that after marriage everything will be all right, that with a wife, I will have children and become "normal" and then I will be at peace. I was struggling and striving to be "normal." I never knew and nobody told me that I was gay and [that] this itself is normal and it will not change. That this is what is called homosexuality and it is not a disease. I tremendously regret for ruining (Chandrika's) life. I feel guilty, but I simply did not know better."

The marriage remained unconsummated. He says, "It was a total disaster. A total failure. The marriage never got consummated. I realized I had done something very wrong. Now two people were suffering instead of one. Far from becoming normal, my life was more miserable."

His wife filed for divorce after just over a year of marriage. Although further requests for marriage were received, he declined them. He suffered a nervous breakdown in 2002. He says:

Upon being informed by psychiatrists that their son was gay, Manvendra's parents accepted the truth, but stipulated that this matter should not be revealed to anyone else. He left Mumbai and began living full-time with his parents in the small town of Rajpipla.

In 2005, Chirantana Bhatt, a young journalist from Vadodara approached Manvendra. He confided his sexual orientation and the mental stress he was going through as a closeted gay man to the journalist. On 14 March 2006, the story of his coming out made headlines. The "coming out" story was first published in the Vadodara edition of Divya Bhaskar, a regional Gujarati language daily of the Bhaskar media group. It was covered the next day in all other editions of Bhaskar groups language newspapers like Dainik Bhaskar (Hindi language) and Daily News Analysis (DNA), an English newspaper. Soon the news appeared in other English and vernacular newspapers across the country, and became a story that they followed up in their gossip and society pages for several weeks afterward. The people of Rajpipla were shocked: Manvendra was burnt in effigy and publicly jeered and heckled. His family accused him of bringing dishonor and disowned him soon after.

He appeared as a guest on The Oprah Winfrey Show on 24 October 2007. He was one of three persons featured in the show entitled 'Gay Around the World'.

He inaugurated the Euro Pride gay festival in Stockholm, Sweden, on 25 July 2008.

He featured in a BBC Television series, Undercover Princes, screened on BBC Three in the UK in January 2009 which documented his search for a British boyfriend in Brighton.

Since July 2010, he has served as editor of the gay male-centric print magazine Fun, which is published in Rajpipla.
In July 2013, Manvendra married an American man named Cecil "DeAndre" Richardson (né Hilton), a Macy's cosmetics employee for Origins, hailing from Albany, Oregon, and living in Seattle.

In January 2021, the false news of him, along with 50 members of the transgender community, joining the Bharatiya Janata Party was circulated.

Charitable activities
In 2000, he started the Lakshya Trust, of which he is chairman, a group dedicated to HIV/AIDS education and prevention. A registered public charitable trust, Lakshya is a community-based organisation working for HIV/AIDS prevention among men who have sex with men (MSMs). It provides counselling services, clinics for treatment of sexually transmitted infections, libraries, and condom-use promotion. The trust also trains female field workers who educate women married to MSM about safe sex practices. Lakshya won the Civil Society Award 2006 for its contribution in preventing HIV/AIDS among homosexual men.

The trust also creates employment opportunities for gay men and support for other organisations for MSMs, and plans to open a hospice/old age home for gay men.

Lakshya is a member of the India Network For Sexual Minorities (INFOSEM) and a founding member of the Sexual Health Action Network (SHAN).

In 2007, Manvendra joined the Interim Governing Board of the Asia Pacific Coalition on Male Sexual Health, known as APCOM, a regional coalition of MSM and HIV community-based organisations, the government sector, donors, technical experts and the UN system. He serves as India Community Representative on behalf of INFOSEM, the India MSM and HIV network. Manvendra said of this work, "APCOM is one of the best mediums to bring together different nationalities and develop linkages with others working for HIV and MSM/TG. In India, it will be an important tool to influence authorities to change thinking and broaden outlooks for the betterment of society. APCOM demonstrates the essence of unity and solidarity within diversity."

In January 2008, while performing an annual ceremony in Rajpipla in honour of his great-grandfather Maharaja Vijaysinhji, Manvendra Gohil announced plans to adopt a child, saying: "I have carried out all my responsibilities as the prince so far and will continue as long as I can. I will also adopt a child soon so that all traditions continue". If the adoption proceeds, it will be the first known case of a single gay man adopting a child in India.

In 2018, Manvendra opened up his 15-acre palace grounds to help house vulnerable LGBTQIA+ people who might otherwise be "left with nothing" when "their families disown them after coming out".

In popular culture

Manvendra Singh Gohil appeared as a guest in three episodes of The Oprah Winfrey Show, as part of the segment called Gays Around the World in 2011, he appeared twice again in 2014 and 2017.

In 2017, he was a special guest in an episode of Keeping Up with the Kardashians titled "India’s first openly gay prince, Manvendra Singh Gohil".

Manvendra was also featured in Cheryl Allison's 2021 documentary Pieces of Us, which profiles people who have experienced anti-LGBTQ hate.

References

External links
 Website of the Lakshya Trust
 Website of the Asia Pacific Coalition on Male Sexual Health (APCOM) 
 Gujarat's Gay Prince to Adopt a Child
 Gay Prince appears on Oprah Show
 Gay Prince to form Sexual Minorities Forum
 Gay Prince to Appear on Oprah Winfrey Show
 The coming out interview in Divya Bhaskar's English newspaper DNA by Chirantana Bhatt, 16 March 2006 (Gujarati was published prior to this)

1965 births
Indian royalty
Gohils
LGBT royalty
Indian LGBT rights activists
Indian gay men
Living people
People from Ajmer
People from Narmada district
Gujarati people
Rajasthani people
Indian LGBT politicians